As of September 2016, the International Union for Conservation of Nature (IUCN) listed 581 critically endangered mollusc species, including 117 which are tagged as possibly extinct. Of all evaluated mollusc species, 8.0% are listed as critically endangered. 
The IUCN also lists 11 mollusc subspecies as critically endangered.

No subpopulations of molluscs have been evaluated by the IUCN.

Additionally 1988 mollusc species (27% of those evaluated) are listed as data deficient, meaning there is insufficient information for a full assessment of conservation status. As these species typically have small distributions and/or populations, they are intrinsically likely to be threatened, according to the IUCN. While the category of data deficient indicates that no assessment of extinction risk has been made for the taxa, the IUCN notes that it may be appropriate to give them "the same degree of attention as threatened taxa, at least until their status can be assessed".

This is a complete list of critically endangered mollusc species and subspecies evaluated by the IUCN. Species considered possibly extinct by the IUCN are marked as such.

Gastropods
There are 511 species and six subspecies of gastropod assessed as critically endangered.

Stylommatophora
Stylommatophora includes the majority of land snails and slugs. There are 233 species and five subspecies in the order Stylommatophora assessed as critically endangered.

Amastrids

Partulids

Achatinellids

Endodontids

Species

Subspecies

Charopids

Helicarionids

Orthalicids

Rhytidids

Streptaxids

Lauriids

Helicids

Hygromiids

Enids

Other Stylommatophora species

Littorinimorpha
There are 181 species in the order Littorinimorpha assessed as critically endangered.

Hydrobiids

Cochliopids

Bithyniids

Moitessieriids
Henrigirardia wienini (possibly extinct)
Spiralix corsica (possibly extinct)

Assimineids

Pomatiopsids

Sorbeoconcha

Architaenioglossa
There are 48 species in the order Architaenioglossa assessed as critically endangered.

Cyclophorids

Diplommatinids

Viviparids

Other Architaenioglossa species

Cycloneritimorpha

Hygrophila

Species

Subspecies
Bulinus tropicus torensis

Neogastropoda

Other gastropod species

Bivalvia
There are 69 species and five subspecies in the class Bivalvia assessed as critically endangered.

Unionida
There are 66 species and five subspecies in the order Unionoida assessed as critically endangered.

Margaritiferids

Species

Subspecies
Margaritifera margaritifera durrovensis

Etheriids
Acostaea rivolii

Unionids

Species

Subspecies

Hyriids
Glenelg freshwater mussel (Hyridella glenelgensis)

Venerida

Cephalopods
Opisthoteuthis chathamensis

See also 
 Lists of IUCN Red List critically endangered species
 List of least concern molluscs
 List of near threatened molluscs
 List of vulnerable molluscs
 List of endangered molluscs
 List of recently extinct molluscs
 List of data deficient molluscs

References 

Molluscs
Critically endangered molluscs